Sabina Eileen Flores Perez is a Guamanian educator and politician. Perez serves as a Democratic senator in the Guam Legislature.

Early life 
Perez is an indigenous CHamoru of Guåhan. Perez graduated from Academy of Our Lady of Guam, an all-girls Catholic high school.

Education 
Perez earned a Bachelor of Science degree in Medical Technology from University of Washington. Perez earned a Master of Arts degree in Teaching from University of Guam.

Career 
Perez is a former Diabetes Researcher at University of California, San Francisco. Perez is a former sales/service representative of Mettler-Toledo Sales.

Perez is former a teacher at Simon Sanchez High School in Yigo, Guam.

On November 6, 2018, Perez won the election and became a Democratic senator in the Guam Legislature. Perez began her term on January 7, 2019 in the 35th Guam Legislature.

On November 2, 2020, as an incumbent, Perez won the election and continued serving as a senator in the 36th Guam Legislature. Perez's current term ends on January 2, 2023.

Personal life 
Perez lives in Barrigada, Guam.

References

External links 
 Sabina Perez at ballotpedia.org
 Sabina Perez at ourcampaigns.com
 36th Guam Legislature - Senators at guamlegislature.com
 Sabina Perez at womensearthalliance.org
 senatorperez.org
 Sabina Perez at rutgers.edu

Guamanian Democrats
Guamanian educators
Guamanian women in politics
Living people
Members of the Legislature of Guam
University of Guam alumni
University of Washington alumni
Year of birth missing (living people)
21st-century American women